Sanson may refer to:

Places
Sanson, New Zealand

People
Samson, biblical judge sometimes known as "Sansón"
Sansón (wrestler) (born 1994), Mexican wrestler
Audley Sanson (born 1974), Jamaican cricketer
Boris Sanson (born 1980), French sabre fencer
Charles-Henri Sanson (1739–1806), public executioner of France from 1788 to 1795
Ernest Sanson (1836–1918), French architect
Henry-Clément Sanson (1799-1889), Royal Executioner of Paris from 1840 to 1847
Jean-Baptiste Sanson de Pongerville (1782–1870), French poet and member of the Académie française
Morgan Sanson (born 1994), French footballer
Nicolas Sanson (1600–1667), French cartographer
Raoul Grimoin-Sanson (1860–1940), inventor in the field of early cinema
Sansón (footballer) (1924-2012), Spanish footballer
Véronique Sanson (born 1949), French singer-songwriter
Yvonne Sanson (1926–2003), Italian film actress

Characters
Andre Sanson, a fictional privateer and antagonist in Michael Crichton's 2009 novel, Pirate Latitudes

Other uses
 Sanson (cycling team), several teams
Sanson Tramway, New Zealand